Moonia is a genus of Asian and Australian flowering plants in the daisy family.

Taxonomy
There are difficulties regarding the classification of this genus for its affinities are uncertain. Further studies are needed to clarify its taxonomic and phylogenetic relationships.

Species list
 Species
 Moonia arnottiana Wight - Sri Lanka, Kerala, Tamil Nadu, Karnataka 
 Moonia ecliptoides (F.Muell.) Benth. - Western Australia, Northern Territory
 Moonia heterophylla Arn. - Sri Lanka, Kerala, Tamil Nadu, Maharashtra 
 Moonia moluccana (Blume) J.Kost. - Maluku (now Quadribractea moluccana)
 Moonia procumbens (DC.) Benth. - Queensland, Northern Territory

 formerly included
 Moonia quadribracteata (Warb.) Mattf., syn of Quadribractea moluccana (Blume) J.Kost.
 Moonia trichodesmoides (F.Muell.) Benth., syn of  Pentalepis trichodesmoides F.Muell.

References

Coreopsideae
Asteraceae genera